The 2016 Ohio Valley Conference women's soccer tournament is the postseason women's soccer tournament for the Ohio Valley Conference to be held from October 30 to November 6, 2016. The five match tournament will be held at campus sites, with the semifinals and final held at Cutchin Field in Murray, Kentucky. The six team single-elimination tournament will consist of three rounds based on seeding from regular season conference play. The Murray State Racers are the defending tournament champions after defeating the Southeast Missouri State Redhawks in overtime in the championship match.

Bracket

Schedule

First Round

Semifinals

Final

References

External links

Ohio Valley Conference Women's Soccer Tournament
2016 Ohio Valley Conference women's soccer season